The breadwinner model is a paradigm of family centered on a breadwinner, "the member of a family who earns the money to support the others." Traditionally, the earner works outside the home to provide the family with income and benefits such as health insurance, while the non-earner stays at home and takes care of children and the elderly. The breadwinner model largely arose in western cultures after industrialization occurred. Before industrialization, all members of the household—including men, women, and children—contributed to the productivity of the household. Gender roles underwent a re-definition as a result of industrialization, with a split between public and private roles for men and women, which did not exist before industrialization.

Since the 1950s, social scientists and feminist theorists such as Germaine Greer have increasingly criticized the gendered division of work and care and the expectation that the breadwinner role should be fulfilled by men. Norwegian government policy has increasingly targeted men as fathers, as a tool of changing gender relations. Recent years have seen a shift in gender norms for the breadwinner role in the U.S. A 2013 Pew Research study found that women were the sole or primary breadwinners in 40% of heterosexual relationships with children.

Rise
In Britain, the breadwinner model developed among the emerging middle class towards the end of the industrial revolution in the mid-nineteenth century. Prior to this, in low-income families, a subsistence wage was paid on the basis of the individual worker's output, with all members of the family expected to contribute to the household upkeep.

There was another side to the transformation of wage relations in mid-19th-century Britain involving two closely related changes: first, a shift in the prevailing wage form, from a joint to an individual payment; and second, a shift in the predominant subsistence norm of a living wage, from a family group's income to the ideal of an adult male-breadwinner wage. This is the notion that the wage earned by a husband ought to be sufficient to support his family without his wife and young children having to work for pay.

The increase in wages among skilled labourers and lower-middle-class workers allowed for a far larger number of families to be able to support the entire family unit on one wage, and the breadwinner model became an attainable goal for a far wider proportion of society. Within this model, "The division of labour in parenting tasks can also be classified as 'caring about' (breadwinning) and 'caring for' (nurturing) children".

Advantages
In the United Kingdom, the emergence of the breadwinner norm coincided with and helped to facilitate the removal of children from the workforce. In 1821, approximately 49% of the nation's workforce was under the age of 20. Throughout the century, multiple items of legislation were written in to law limiting the age at which a child could enter work and ensuring mandatory standards of education.

Historically, families that rely on the earning power of one parent have had a lower divorce rate than families where both parents are in gainful employment. However, a lower divorce rate is not universally accepted as a positive facet of society. A primary reason women in domestic abuse situations choose not to divorce or report their spouses is economic dependence on their partner.  Marriages in a breadwinner economy may last longer or be less likely to end, but this may be an effect of the economically disadvantaged partner lacking the freedom to end a bad marriage.

Disadvantages
One associated disadvantage is that 'male breadwinner regimes make women dependent within marriage cohabitation especially when they have young children'. In societies where the breadwinner model is present, it is common for the non-earner (predominantly women) to have broken career paths, providing unpaid labour to the family or working part-time. This contributes to the fact that, on average, women obtain lower levels of lifetime earnings than men. This income disparity can often lead to an increase in financial insecurity or poverty – predominantly affecting women – if the relationship collapses. Another risk that has been identified with this has been a higher exposure to domestic violence, which has been associated with the non-earner's lack of independent resources.

Since the US economy has evolved past the breadwinner economy, studies have examined the well-being of working mothers. Data spanning over 10 years showed that on average working mothers are happier than stay at home mothers, report better health and lower depression.

Effect on gender identity 
As breadwinning has been part of male identity in societies that have a breadwinner economy, people may continue to expect men to take on a breadwinner role, and some may be against women taking on the breadwinning role. However, people in younger generations report less strict expectations gendered expectations for men to be a breadwinner. When surveyed, people in all generations report that it is more important that their spouse is a good partner or parent than that their partner is a breadwinner.

Decline of the male breadwinner
In 2013 the UK female employment rate reached 67.2 per cent, the highest since the Office for National Statistics' records began.
As women's growing presence in the professional world has risen, as well as support for gender equality, male–female relations in the home have changed, especially the breadwinner paradigm. The breadwinner model was most prevalent during the 20-year period directly after World War II. During this time, the economy relied heavily on men to financially support the family and to provide the main source of income, typically relying on women to stay at home and look after the children and undertaking domestic work. "Women's support for gender specialisation in marriage began to decline rapidly from the late 1970s through to the mid 1980s, this was followed by an interval of stability until the mid 1990s". "As increasing proportions of women entered the paid labour market during the latter decades of the 20th century, the family model of a male breadwinner and female homemaker came under significant challenge both as a practice and an ideology".

The Nordic countries in particular have begun to adopt the dual-breadwinner model, with high employment rates among men and women, and a very small difference between men's and women's hours of work. With the exception of Denmark, research by the World Economic Forum has shown that all Nordic countries have closed over 80 percent of the gender gap.

Breadwinner mothers
The female breadwinner model, otherwise known as "Breadwinner Moms", takes place when the female provides the main source of income for the family. Recent data from the US Census stated that "40% of all households with children under the age of 18 include mothers who are either the sole or primary source of income for the family". 37% of these "Breadwinner Moms" are married mothers who have a higher income than their husbands, and 63% are single mothers.

Concerns with the decline of the breadwinner model
The decline of the breadwinner model has been accompanied by an erosion of the economic support of family members and the "distribution of time and regulation of marriage and parenthood". With two parents in the workforce, there is a risk that a job could undermine family life, consequently leading to relationship breakdown or adversely affecting original family formation.

While some evidence suggests that "women's gains on the economic front may be contributing to a decline in the formation and stability of marriages", one reason for this may be that women with greater earning and economic security have more freedom to leave abusive marriages. Another possibility could be that men are more hesitant to this change in social norms.

Global variations 
The ideal of the breadwinning model varies across the globe. In Norway, a country with strong gender equality ideology, the breadwinner model is less prevalent. Second generation Pakistani immigrants living in Norway experience the effects of this equality and reinforce women's rights to paid work as opposed to the strict male centric ideologies that generations before them practiced. In the United Kingdom, women's rates of employment decline after becoming a mother, and the male breadwinning model is still constant.

In the United States during industrialization, nothing was more central to the American industrial order than the breadwinner ideal. It served to promote commerce while keeping it within proper bounds. The American Federation of Labor adopted a politics of male breadwinning. However, the North and South didn't agree on this new cultural ideal and it contributed to sectional political strife.

Notes
 
Book review: 
 
 
 
 
 
 
  Pdf.
  Text.

References

Economic systems
Home economics